Cerro Chaihuín is a mountain in the Cordillera Pelada. It lies 13 km east of Colún Beach and Hueicolla and 16 km southeast of Caleta Chaihuín.

Mountains of Chile
Mountains of Los Ríos Region
Chilean Coast Range